Netaji Subhas National Institute of Sports, commonly known as National Institute of Sports (NIS), is the Academic Wing of the Sports Authority of India (SAI) and Asia's largest Sports Institute located in city of Patiala.

History 
Founded on 7 May 1961, the institute was renamed as Netaji Subhas National Institute of Sports in January 1973. It is merged with SAI in 1987. Spread over 268 acres, NIS is housed in the Old Moti Bagh Palace of the erstwhile royal family of Patiala State, which was purchased by Government of India after Indian Independence.

NIS Directors

Memorabilia 
Today, several items of sports memorabilia, like a hass (doughnut-shaped exercise disc), weighing 95 kg, used by The Great Gama, for squats, and Major Dhyan Chand's gold medal from the 1928 Amsterdam Olympics, and PT Usha's 1986 Seoul Asiad shoes, are housed at the National Institute of Sports Museum.

Departments 
 Department of Sports Medicine
 Department of Exercise Physiology
 Department of Sports Biochemistry
 Department of Sports Anthropometry
 Department of Sports Psychology
 Department of Sports Nutrition
 Department of General Theory & Methods of Training
 Department of Biomechanics

References

External links
National Institute of Sports, Patiala

Universities and colleges in Punjab, India
Organisations based in Patiala
Sport schools in India
1961 establishments in East Punjab
Sport in Punjab, India
Tourist attractions in Patiala
Museums in Punjab, India
Sports museums